Argyrotaenia klotsi is a species of moth of the family Tortricidae. It is found in the United States, where it has been recorded from Arizona, New Mexico and California.

The length of the forewings is 8-9.5 mm. The ground color of the forewings is pale ocherous, but somewhat brownish salmon dorsad and pale silvery gray externad. The basal area is dark grey, mottled and outlined with darker grey. The hindwings are fuscous white. Adults have been recorded on wing from July to August.

References

K
Moths of North America
Fauna of the Southwestern United States
Moths described in 1961